Jaelen Feeney (born 14 October 1994) is an Indigenous Australian professional rugby league footballer who plays as a  and  for the Townsville Blackhawks in the Queensland Cup. He previously played for the Newcastle Knights in the NRL.

Background
Born in Sydney, New South Wales, Feeney is of Indigenous Australian descent and moved to Queensland at a young age. He played his junior rugby league for the Nerang Roosters, while attending Keebra Park State High School and Palm Beach Currumbin, before being signed by the Canterbury-Bankstown Bulldogs.

Playing career

Early career
In 2013, Feeney played for the Canterbury-Bankstown Bulldogs' NYC team. In 2014, he joined the Newcastle Knights and played for their NYC team. On 3 May 2014, he played for the Queensland under-20s team against the New South Wales under-20s team. In 2015, he graduated to the Knights' New South Wales Cup team. On 3 September 2015, he re-signed with the Knights on a two-year contract. On 27 September, he played in the Knights' 2015 New South Wales Cup Grand Final win over the Wyong Roos.

2016
In round 1 of the 2016 NRL season, Feeney made his NRL debut for Newcastle against the Gold Coast Titans.  Feeney played a total of six appearances for Newcastle in the 2016 NRL season .

2017
After playing a further 20 NRL games for the Knights as they finished bottom half of the table, Feeney left the club at the end of the 2017 season .

2018
Ahead of the 2018 season, Feeney joined the Townsville Blackhawks in the Queensland Cup.

References

External links

QRL profile
Newcastle Knights profile

1994 births
Living people
Australian rugby league players
Indigenous Australian rugby league players
Newcastle Knights players
Rugby league five-eighths
Rugby league halfbacks
Rugby league fullbacks
Rugby league players from Sydney